Jack Thimesch (born 1960) is an American politician who served as a Republican member for the 114th district in the Kansas House of Representatives from 2013 to 2021.

References

1960 births
Living people
Republican Party members of the Kansas House of Representatives
21st-century American politicians